The Trans-Gabon Railway is the only railway in Gabon.

History 

A railway was first planned in 1885.  Investigations into the line were conducted in 1968, funding was agreed in 1973, and construction began the following year.  The first section, from Owendo to Ndjolé, opened in 1978, with the remaining sections opening in stages until December 1986.  Costs were well over budget and almost bankrupted the country.

The Trans-Gabon Railway is overall adjacent the Ogooue River until Ndjolé.  Most important constructions are the Juckville Tunnel, the viaduct over the Abanga swamp, and the bridge over the confluence between the Ogooue and the Ivindo Rivers.

The line to Franceville was completed in 1987.

Originally intended to reach Makokou and carry iron ore, its route was changed for political reasons, namely to keep within national borders manganese ore traffic from  COMILOG that went on the COMILOG Cableway via the Republic of Congo.   When the railway reached the manganese mine at Moanda, the Cableway was closed.

The railway was privatised in 1999.  Plans regularly surface proposing an extension to Brazzaville in the Republic of the Congo.

Construction and specifications 
Because the line was built well into the era of earthmoving machinery, the need to choose a narrow gauge to save costs was no longer important. As well, the choice of standard gauge took advantage of off-the-shelf equipment. It was constructed by a consortium of Impregilo, Astaldi, Philipp Holzmann, Constructions Et Entreprises Industrielles and Entreprise De Construction Franco-Africaine.

The discovery of uranium helped to secure British interest in the project, and led to the injection of funds by the Conservative government under prime minister Margaret Thatcher. Many UK expatriates took the place of French workers and the building of the railway progressed rapidly from that point. Circa May 1983 CCI Eurotrag (a consortium of British, Italian and German interests) took over funding. British firms involved included Wimpey International, who seconded staff to Taylor Woodrow.

The building of the initial 182 kilometres of the line from Owendo to Ndjole took over 10 years to complete. The remaining 400-plus kilometres took only five years.

Recent history

In 2003 Hughes Network Systems (see Hughes Communications) installed a satellite based telephony system into all the railway stations of the railway.

In June 2006 a new line for iron ore from Belinga to port was announced.  It is unclear if it will use part of the existing line.  The track will be standard gauge. This line was supposed to open in 2012, but in 2014 completion is still awaited.

Two EMD JT42CWR locomotives shipped September 2011. A further 4 locomotives and 10 passenger coaches were also ordered.

On 18 May 2019 three workers were killed in an accident on the line.

In February 2023 Fortescue Metals Group inked in an agreement to develop iron ore at Belinda with a road and railway to an existing port.

Network
There are no links with the adjacent states of  Equatorial Guinea, Cameroon, or the Republic of the Congo.
The railway is important for transporting timber and uranium in addition to being the only important public transport route in the nation. In 1996, the railway carried freight and 190,000 passengers.
The Trans-Gabon Railway,  has 23 stations.

Trivia 
 The Trans-Gabon Railway crosses the Ogooué River five times, at Franceville, at Ndjolé, and three times around Booué, also at Lastoursville, where one girder bridge crosses the river to the east of Lastoursville. The Italians were responsible for the actual bridge building from Lastoursville heading East toward the Congo.

See also 
 Transport in Gabon
 AfricaRail

References

Literature
 Minko Monique. 1983. Les communications Terrestres. in Geographie et Cartographie du Gabon, Atlas Illustré led by The Ministère de l'Education Nationale de la Republique Gabonaise. Pg 86-87. Paris, France: Edicef

External links
 
 UN Map

Rail transport in Gabon
Railway lines in Gabon